The 2004 Lunar New Year Cup (aka Carlsberg Cup) was a football tournament held in Hong Kong over the first and fourth day of the Chinese New Year holiday (22 January 2004 and 25 January 2004).

Participating teams
  Hong Kong League XI (host)
  Honduras
  Norway
  Sweden

Squads

Hong Kong League XI
 Coach:  Lai Sun Cheung

Honduras
 Coach:  Bora Milutinović

Norway
 Coach: Age Hareide

Sweden
 Coaches: Tommy Söderberg, Lars Lagerbäck

Results

Semifinals

Third place match

Final

Bracket

Top scorers
2 goals
 Frode Johnsen
 Havard Flo
 Lasse Nilsson

1 goal
 Magne Hoset
 Harald Brattbakk
 Pompilio Cacho
 Saúl Martínez
 Babis Stefanidis

See also
Hong Kong Football Association
Hong Kong First Division League

References
 Carlsberg Cup 2004, Rsssf.com
 XXII. Carlsberg Cup Chinese New Years Tournament 2004 - Details, YANSFIELD

2004
2004 in Norwegian football
2003–04 in Hong Kong football
2004 in Swedish football
2003–04 in Honduran football